The Amsterdam Coalition was an electoral alliance of centre-left and liberal political parties in Croatia.

History
The alliance consisted of six parties - the Civic Liberal Alliance (GLAS), Istrian Democratic Assembly (IDS-DDI), Croatian Peasant Party (HSS), Alliance of Primorje-Gorski Kotar (PGS), Democrats and Croatian Labourists. It was formally formed on the 8 December 2018 when Anka Mrak-Taritaš (GLAS), Krešo Beljak (HSS) and Boris Miletić (IDS-DDI) signed a coalition agreement for the 2019 European Parliament election in Croatia. On 23 February 2019, the Coalition presented their list of 12 candidates for the 2019 European Parliament election, headed by Valter Flego of the IDS.

The coalition stated in their programme that they "fight for a progressive, free and prosperous Croatia", while also "opposing intolerance, incompetence and primitivism".

The term "Amsterdam Coalition" first started appearing in Croatian media at the end of 2017, after GLAS and Pametno joined the Alliance of Liberals and Democrats for Europe Party, a transnational European political party, in Amsterdam. Pametno left the coalition in August 2018, after disagreements concerning the Uljanik shipbuilding company. After the 2019 European Parliament election, the Croatian Party of Pensioners (HSU) announced that they are leaving the alliance and joining the Social Democratic Party of Croatia for the 2020 parliamentary election. GLAS President Anka Mrak-Taritaš confirmed in March 2020 that the coalition doesn't exist anymore.

Members

Electoral performance

European Parliament

References

2018 establishments in Croatia
2020 disestablishments in Croatia
Defunct political party alliances in Croatia
Left-wing political party alliances